In algebraic geometry, the abundance conjecture is a conjecture in 
birational geometry, more precisely in the minimal model program,
stating that for every projective variety  with Kawamata log terminal singularities over a field  if the canonical bundle  is nef, then  is semi-ample.

Important cases of the abundance conjecture have been proven by Caucher Birkar.

References 

Algebraic geometry
Birational geometry
Unsolved problems in geometry